Nakonde is a town in the Muchinga Province of Zambia, on the border with Tanzania. It is at the northern end of Zambia's Great North Road (T2 Road). It is the principal commercial and political headquarters of Nakonde District and the district headquarters are located here.

Location
Nakonde sits directly across Tunduma, in Tanzania's Songwe Region, separated by the international border between Zambia and Tanzania. It is the last Zambian town on the Cape to Cairo Road, also known as the Pan-African Highway, which goes from Cape Town to Cairo.

The geographical coordinates of the town are: 09°19'38.0"S, 32°45'30.0"E (Latitude:-9.327222; Longitude:32.758333). Roughly  to the west is Chozi.

Overview
Nakonde lies on the main Highway that connects Lusaka, the capital of Zambia, to Kapiri Mposhi, Isoka, through Nakonde and on to Tunduma and Dar es Salaam, in neighboring Tanzania. The town is a busy border crossing with both rail and road traffic. The TAZARA Railway passes through the town.

Three banks maintain branches in Nakonde; Barclays Bank of Zambia, Atlas Mara Bank Zambia Limited and Zambia National Commercial Bank.

It is estimated that 85 percent of Zambia's exports transit through Nakonde. However, inadequate housing, poor road infrastructure, lack of readily available grid electricity, inadequate supply of potable water, an under-developed sewerage system, poor schools and the absence of a post-secondary educational institution (university), are some of the challenges facing the town.

Population
As of February 2006, the population of Nakonde was estimated at approximately 10,652 people.

See also
 TAZARA Railway

References

External links
Nakonde-Tunduma one-stop border in pilot phase As of 3 February 2017.

Populated places in Muchinga Province
Tanzania–Zambia border crossings